The 2009 MTV Video Music Awards, honoring the best music videos from the previous year between June 2008 to June 2009, were presented on September 13, 2009, at the Radio City Music Hall in New York City, and televised by MTV. The ceremony was hosted by Russell Brand.

Beyoncé, Green Day, and Lady Gaga were tied for the most-awarded acts of the night, winning three awards each. Beyoncé's "Single Ladies (Put a Ring on It)" would win the award for Video of the Year, while Beyoncé and Lady Gaga were both tied for the largest number of nominations with nine, followed by Britney Spears with seven. In the aftermath of his June 2009 death, the show featured various tributes to Michael Jackson, including an opening act featuring a medley of Jackson's biggest hits and a special appearance by Janet Jackson to perform her duet "Scream", and the premiere of a trailer for the posthumous documentary film Michael Jackson's This Is It.

The ceremony was marred when Kanye West interrupted Taylor Swift's acceptance of the award for Best Female Video, in order to proclaim that despite her victory, Beyoncé still had "one of the best videos of all time" (in reference to the aforementioned "Single Ladies"). When Beyoncé was eventually awarded Video of the Year, she acknowledged the moment when she had won her first VMA as part of Destiny's Child, and invited Swift back to the stage to finish her acceptance speech. The incident was highly publicized after the ceremony, with Rolling Stone naming it the "wildest" moment in the history of the Video Music Awards in 2013.

The broadcast  was seen by a total of 9 million viewers, a 17% increase over 2008, making it the most-watched VMAs since 2004.

Performances

House band performances
Rapper Wale and go-go band UCB served as the house band for the show, performing right before, during, and right after commercial breaks.  Throughout the show they also had various special guests and performed the following songs:
 Wale and UCB – "Breakdown"
 Wale and UCB – "Chillin"
 3OH!3, Wale and UCB – "Don't Trust Me"
 Wale and UCB – "Viva la Vida"
 Pitbull, Wale and UCB – "I Know You Want Me (Calle Ocho)"
 Solange, Wale and UCB – "Use Somebody"
 The All-American Rejects, Wale and UCB – "Gives You Hell"
 Kid Cudi, Wale and UCB – "Remembering DJ AM"
 Wale and UCB – "Pretty Girls"

Awards
Winners are in bold text.

Video of the Year
Beyoncé – "Single Ladies (Put a Ring on It)"
 Eminem – "We Made You"
 Lady Gaga – "Poker Face"
 Britney Spears – "Womanizer"
 Kanye West – "Love Lockdown"

Best Male Video
T.I. (featuring Rihanna) – "Live Your Life"
 Eminem – "We Made You"
 Jay-Z – "D.O.A. (Death of Auto-Tune)"
 Ne-Yo – "Miss Independent"
 Kanye West – "Love Lockdown"

Best Female Video
Taylor Swift – "You Belong with Me"
 Beyoncé – "Single Ladies (Put a Ring on It)"
 Kelly Clarkson – "My Life Would Suck Without You"
 Lady Gaga – "Poker Face"
 Katy Perry – "Hot n Cold"
 Pink – "So What"

Best New Artist
Lady Gaga – "Poker Face"
 3OH!3 – "Don't Trust Me"
 Drake – "Best I Ever Had"
 Kid Cudi – "Day 'n' Nite"
 Asher Roth – "I Love College"

Best Pop Video
Britney Spears – "Womanizer"
 Beyoncé – "Single Ladies (Put a Ring on It)"
 Cobra Starship (featuring Leighton Meester) – "Good Girls Go Bad"
 Lady Gaga – "Poker Face"
 Wisin & Yandel – "Abusadora"

Best Rock Video
Green Day – "21 Guns"
 Coldplay – "Viva la Vida"
 Fall Out Boy – "I Don't Care"
 Kings of Leon – "Use Somebody"
 Paramore – "Decode"

Best Hip-Hop Video
Eminem – "We Made You"
 Flo Rida – "Right Round"
 Jay-Z – "D.O.A. (Death of Auto-Tune)"
 Asher Roth – "I Love College"
 Kanye West – "Love Lockdown"

Breakthrough Video
Matt and Kim – "Lessons Learned"
 Anjulie – "Boom"
 Bat for Lashes – "Daniel"
 Chairlift – "Evident Utensil"
 Cold War Kids – "I've Seen Enough"
 Death Cab for Cutie – "Grapevine Fires"
 Gnarls Barkley – "Who's Gonna Save My Soul"
 Major Lazer – "Hold the Line"
 Passion Pit – "The Reeling"
 Yeah Yeah Yeahs – "Heads Will Roll"

Best Direction
Green Day – "21 Guns" (Director: Marc Webb)
 Beyoncé – "Single Ladies (Put a Ring on It)" (Director: Jake Nava)
 Cobra Starship (featuring Leighton Meester) – "Good Girls Go Bad" (Director: Kai Regan)
 Lady Gaga – "Paparazzi" (Director: Jonas Åkerlund)
 Britney Spears – "Circus" (Director: Francis Lawrence)

Best Choreography
Beyoncé – "Single Ladies (Put a Ring on It)" (Choreographers: Frank Gatson Jr. and JaQuel Knight)
 Ciara (featuring Justin Timberlake) – "Love Sex Magic" (Choreographers: Jamaica Craft and Marty Kudelka)
 Kristinia DeBarge – "Goodbye" (Choreographer: Jamaica Craft)
 A. R. Rahman and The Pussycat Dolls (featuring Nicole Scherzinger) – "Jai Ho! (You Are My Destiny)" (Choreographers: Robin Antin and Mikey Minden)
 Britney Spears – "Circus" (Choreographer: Andre Fuentes)

Best Special Effects
Lady Gaga – "Paparazzi" (Special Effects: Chimney Pot)
 Beyoncé – "Single Ladies (Put a Ring on It)" (Special Effects: VFX Effects and Louis Mackall V)
 Eminem – "We Made You" (Special Effects: Ingenuity Engine)
 Gnarls Barkley – "Who's Gonna Save My Soul" (Special Effects: Gradient Effects and Image Metrics)
 Kanye West (featuring Mr Hudson) – "Paranoid" (Special Effects: Wizardflex and Ghost Town Media)

Best Art Direction
Lady Gaga – "Paparazzi" (Art Director: Jason Hamilton)
 Beyoncé – "Single Ladies (Put a Ring on It)" (Art Director: Niamh Byrne)
 Coldplay – "Viva la Vida" (Art Director: Gregory de Maria)
 Gnarls Barkley – "Who's Gonna Save My Soul" (Art Director: Zach Matthews)
 Britney Spears – "Circus" (Art Directors: Laura Fox and Charles Varga)

Best Editing
Beyoncé – "Single Ladies (Put a Ring on It)" (Editor: Jarrett Fijal)
 Coldplay – "Viva la Vida" (Editor: Hype Williams)
 Miley Cyrus – "7 Things" (Editor: Jarrett Fijal)
 Lady Gaga – "Paparazzi" (Editors: Danny Tull and Jonas Åkerlund)
 Britney Spears – "Circus" (Editor: Jarrett Fijal)

Best Cinematography
Green Day – "21 Guns" (Director of Photography: Jonathan Sela)
 Beyoncé – "Single Ladies (Put a Ring on It)" (Director of Photography: Jim Fealy)
 Coldplay – "Viva la Vida" (Director of Photography: John Perez)
 Lady Gaga – "Paparazzi" (Director of Photography: Eric Broms)
 Britney Spears – "Circus" (Director of Photography: Thomas Kloss)

Best Video (That Should Have Won a Moonman)
Beastie Boys – "Sabotage"
 Björk – "Human Behaviour"
 Dr. Dre – "Nuthin' but a 'G' Thang"
 Foo Fighters – "Everlong"
 George Michael – "Freedom! '90"
 OK Go – "Here It Goes Again"
 Tom Petty and the Heartbreakers – "Into the Great Wide Open"
 Radiohead – "Karma Police"
 David Lee Roth – "California Girls"
 U2 – "Where the Streets Have No Name"

Best Performance in a Pepsi Rock Band Video
Nerds in Disguise – "My Own Worst Enemy"
 Blaq Star – "Shining Star"
 One (Wo)Man Band – "Bad Reputation"
 The Sleezy Treezy – "Here It Goes Again"
 Synopsis – "The Kill"

Best Breakout Artist Awards
Eight local MTV VMA Best Breakout Artist Awards were awarded. The table below lists the number of bands considered in each city, the three finalist nominees selected by MTV for each VMA, and the winner in bold. The winners were featured on MTV on local cable during the live VMAs and received featured coverage on MTV and MTV2 (or MTV Tr3́s in the case of the LA contest).

Appearances

Pre-show
 Buzz Aldrin – presented Breakthrough Video
 Sway Calloway – presented Best Video (That Should Have Won a Moonman)

Main show
 Madonna – opened the show with a speech about Michael Jackson
 Shakira and Taylor Lautner – presented Best Female Video
 Jack Black and Leighton Meester – presented Best Rock Video
 Miranda Cosgrove and Justin Bieber – introduced Taylor Swift
 Pete Wentz and Gabe Saporta – introduced Lady Gaga
 Nelly Furtado and Kristin Cavallari – presented Best Pop Video
 Megan Fox and Adam Brody – introduced Green Day
 Robert Pattinson, Kristen Stewart and Taylor Lautner – introduced an exclusive New Moon sneak peek preview
 Chace Crawford and Ne-Yo – introduced Beyoncé
 Diddy and Jamie-Lynn Sigler – presented Best Male Video
 Gerard Butler and Alexa Chung – introduced Muse
 Jennifer Lopez – presented Best Hip-Hop Video
 Eminem and Tracy Morgan – presented Best New Artist
 Serena Williams – introduced Pink
 Jimmy Fallon and Andy Samberg – presented Video of the Year

Kanye West–Taylor Swift incident

As Taylor Swift was giving her Best Female Video acceptance speech for "You Belong with Me", Kanye West went on stage, took the microphone from her, and said: "Yo, Taylor, I'm really happy for you, I'mma let you finish, but Beyoncé had one of the best videos of all time! One of the best videos of all time!" (West was referring to the music video for "Single Ladies (Put a Ring on It)".) As the live audience booed, West handed the microphone back to Swift, flipped off the crowd, and walked off stage.

West was subsequently removed from the show. Later in the show, Beyoncé won Video of the Year for "Single Ladies" and called Swift back to the stage to let her finish her speech.

Various celebrities and industry figures, and prominent political figures such as at the time U.S. President Barack Obama and former U.S. President Jimmy Carter, condemned West for the verbal outburst. West apologized on his blog and during an appearance on The Jay Leno Show.

Emil Wilbekin, managing editor of Essence magazine, argued that West may have gone too far with his antics this time: "I think that it was not Kanye's place to speak for Beyoncé or to ruin Taylor Swift's moment...  It's OK for Kanye to rattle off about himself, but I think he crossed the line when he decided to speak for other people." Ann Powers of the Los Angeles Times opined that "from one vantage point, it was a case of chivalry gone horribly wrong" as West meant to "stand up for" Beyoncé. She was cynical about the onstage embrace the two women shared, calling it "staged" and saying it added "another layer of meaning to an already complicated moment. Now this controversy was about women sticking up for each other, too."

In 2013, Rolling Stone named the incident the wildest moment in VMA history. The outburst resulted in a meme consisting of images of West being superimposed onto other images with text in the style of his interruption ("X is one of the greatest Y of all time", or variants thereon, in some cases preceded by "I'm really happy for you" and/or "I'mma let you finish")."

See also
2009 MTV Europe Music Awards

References

External links
 Official VMA 2009 site

2009
MTV Video Music Awards
MTV Video Music Awards
MTV Video Music Awards
2009 awards in the United States
2009 scandals
Television controversies in the United States